La vida precoz y breve de Sabina Rivas is a 2012 Mexican drama film directed by Luis Mandoki. The film received eleven nominations at the 55th Ariel Awards including Best Director for Mandoki.

Plot
Young Honduran teenagers, Sabina and Jovany, see each other again on the Mexican-Guatemalan border, after being apart for several years. She is working in a sleazy strip joint but wants to get to the United States and to be a great singer; he has become a member of la Mara Salvatrucha, a violent gang.

At the border, they must cope with exploitation and harassment in a society dominated by brothel matrons and pimps, consular officials, immigration authorities, the army and la Mara Salvatrucha. Those in power organise drug trafficking; those lower down the pecking order also benefit from pimping or exploit illegal migrants.

Sabina goes through a rough time and a complicated relationship with Jovany in attempt to cross the United States border and become a famous singer. She makes a career in a strip joint making money by stripping and singing in front of the crowds. She is often also frequently paid to entertain at parties. The corrupt border control officers that work at the border between the countries of Guatemala and Mexico throw parties at the border that Sabina is responsible for entertaining. She uses these opportunities to attempt to cross the border, but she is always denied. She also gets mistreated by the border control and is even raped by one of the officers. This officer violently rapes her as well as strangles her with his belt. There is many hardships that Sabina has to overcome in her attempts to cross the border and eventually enter the United States to pursue her singing career.

Cast
 as Sabina Rivas
Joaquín Cosío as Burrona
Fernando Moreno as Jovany
 as Doña Lita
Mario Zaragoza as Sarabia
Beto Benitez as Añorve
Nick Chinlund as Patrick
Miguel Flores as Don Nico
Argél Galindo as Poisson
Tenoch Huerta Mejía as Juan
Dagoberto Gama as General Valderrama
Luis Eduardo Yee as Pedro
Tito Vasconcelos as Presentador Tijuanita
José Sefami as Cossío
Asur Zagada as Thalía

Awards and nominations

External links

References

2012 films
2012 drama films
Mexican drama films
2010s Spanish-language films
Films directed by Luis Mandoki
2010s Mexican films